Fluxinella lenticulosa is a species of extremely small deep water sea snail, a marine gastropod mollusk in the family Seguenziidae.

Description
The height of the thin, white shell attains 2.3 mm. It is strongly depressed with a width of 6.85 mm. It is umbilicate and translucent nacreous.

Distribution
This marine species occurs off New Zealand found at depths between 800 m and 1,000 m.

References

External links
 To Encyclopedia of Life
 To World Register of Marine Species

lenticulosa
Gastropods described in 1983